Franco De Rosa (born 16 July 1944, Viareggio) is an Italian actor who was active in Italian and British cinema and television from the 1960s to the 1980s.

Filmography
 Johnny Oro as Juanito Perez (1966) 
 Nude ... si muore (English title: The Young, the Evil and the Savage; 1968)
 Doppelgänger (a.k.a. Journey to the Far Side of the Sun; 1969) as Paulo Landi
 Sartana nella valle degli avvoltoi (English titles: Sartana in the Valley of Vultures and Ballad of Death Valley; 1970)
 Holiday On The Buses as Luigi (1973)

References

External links

1944 births
20th-century Italian male actors
Italian male film actors
Italian male television actors
Living people
People from Viareggio
Male Spaghetti Western actors